Scott Moffatt (born c. 1981 in Rideau Township, Ontario) is the Ottawa city councillor of Rideau-Goulbourn Ward. He won the ward in the 2010 Ottawa municipal election, defeating the incumbent Glenn Brooks.

Moffatt was born and raised on a farm in Rideau Township, now part of rural Ottawa. He attended Kars Public School (which has since become Kars on the Rideau Public School), South Carleton High School and received a General B.A. from Carleton University. He lives in North Gower, Ontario. Prior to being elected, he served as a retail and golf course manager.

Moffatt has volunteered for the Conservative Party of Canada in the past and served on its board of directors. He ran unsuccessfully in the Rideau-Goulbourn Ward in the 2006 Ottawa municipal election.

External links
Official website
Scott Moffatt at the City of Ottawa website
Councillor Scott Moffatt recalls early interest in politics at Canada.com

References

Living people
Ottawa city councillors
Year of birth missing (living people)